Blues InteractionLive in Japan 1986 is a album by blues singer and guitarist Otis Rush, recorded live in Tokyo in December 1986.  Recorded with Break Down, a local Japanese band, it features tunes originally popularized by Rush and other blues and R&B artists.

Critical reception

In a review for AllMusic, Rev. Keith A. Gordon gave the album 2 1/2 out of five stars and considered Rush's compositions "Tops", "All Your Love" and "Double Trouble" as the album's highlights. However, he concluded, "The inconsistency of Rush's performance and the mediocre skills of the backing band make Live in Japan 1986 a mixed bag appealing mostly to blues completists and Rush fanatics."

Track listing
All tracks are written by Otis Rush, except where noted.
"Tops"7:22
"All Your Love (I Miss Loving)"5:48
"Please, Please, Please" (James Brown, Johnny Terry)4:51
"Killing Floor" (Chester Burnett  Howlin' Wolf)8:43
"Stand By Me" (Ben E. King, Jerry Leiber and Mike Stoller)5:36
"Lonely Man" (Milton Campbell, Bob Lyons)2:50
"Double Trouble"4:11
"Right Place, Wrong Time"7:19
"Got My Mojo Working" (Preston Foster)6:30
"Gambler's Blues" (B.B. King, Jules Taub)10:03

References

Otis Rush albums
1989 live albums
Live blues albums
P-Vine Records albums